The 1923 Lafayette football team was an American football team that represented Lafayette College as an independent during the 1923 college football season. In its fifth and final season under head coach Jock Sutherland, the team compiled a 6–1–2 record. Arthur Deibel was the team captain.  The team played its home games at March Field in Easton, Pennsylvania.

Schedule

References

Lafayette
Lafayette Leopards football seasons
Lafayette football